Andrew D. Katz (born April 7, 1968) is a college basketball analyst for the Big Ten Network and a college basketball correspondent for the NCAA. He formerly worked as a senior college basketball journalist for ESPN.com, and was a regular sports analyst on College GameNight on ESPN. Katz earned a B.A. at the University of Wisconsin–Madison (1990), and began working for ESPN in 2000.

Career
Before Katz joined ESPN, he was a sports reporter for The Fresno Bee (1995–1999); the Albuquerque Journal (1990–1995); and the Milwaukee Journal Sentinel (1989–1990).

On April 26, 2017, Katz was among over 100 employees laid off by ESPN. After leaving ESPN, Katz did color commentary for the Paradise Jam tournament held in Lynchburg, VA.
Katz is currently a college basketball studio analyst for the Big Ten Network (BTN).

References

Sources
Andy Katz ESPN Bio

External links

Living people
1969 births
University of Wisconsin–Madison alumni
College basketball announcers in the United States
ESPN people
Milwaukee Journal Sentinel people
People from West Hartford, Connecticut
20th-century American journalists
American male journalists
Newton South High School alumni